Mizanur Rahman Chowdhury (died 6 April 2013) was a Bangladesh Jamaat-e-Islami politician and the former Member of Parliament from Nilphamari-3.

Career
Chowdhury was elected to Parliament in 1996 from Nilphamari-3 as a candidate of Bangladesh Jamaat-e-Islami. He was reelected in 2001 from Nilphamari-3. His constituency, Jaldhaka Upazila, is a stronghold of Jamaat-e-Islami. In 2008 he was expelled from Jamaat-e-Islami, on charges of stealing of government corrugated iron sheets in court.

Controversy
Chowdhury forced Jaldhaka College Principal Md Rahmat Ullah to resign an appointed Mozaharul Islam, a member of Bangladesh Jamaat-e-Islami. The decision was protested by the student body of the college. Md. Rahmat Ullah was reinstated as principal by the Nilphamari Additional District and Sessions Judge's Court on 26 May 2009. During his term as Member of Parliament Chwodhury had replaced more than hundred teachers and administrators in educational institutions in his constituency with Bangladesh Jamaat-e-Islami politicians.

References

2013 deaths
Bangladesh Jamaat-e-Islami politicians
7th Jatiya Sangsad members
8th Jatiya Sangsad members
People from Nilphamari District